Donuimun  (Hangul 돈의문, Hanja 敦義門; also known as West Gate)  was one of the Eight Gates of Seoul in the Fortress Wall of Seoul, South Korea, which surrounded the city in the Joseon Dynasty. The gate's historical location is also known as Seodaemun (서대문, 西大門  "West Big Gate").

History

Donuimun was originally built in 1396. It was burned as a result of the 16th century invasions by Japan, but was rebuilt in 1711. 
In 1413(King Tajo 13),the gate was closed. In 1422(King Sejong 4)Donuimun gate was repaired. In 1711(King Sukjong 37)Donuimun Gate was rebuilt in 1711.
In 1915, the gate was again destroyed during the Japanese colonial period. The gate was photographed at various times before its destruction, most notably by in a series of photographs taken by Presbyterian missionary Horace Grant Underwood in 1904. Some of these photographs show the tracks of an "American Electric Tramway" running through the gate.

The name Donuimun means literally "Loyalty Gate." It was one of the Four Great Gates in the Fortress Wall of Seoul.

Reconstruction
Donuimun was demolished in 1915, during Japanese rule of Korea, in order to facilitate the construction of a tram line. In 2009, Seoul Metropolitan Government announced plans to rebuild Donuimun, using maps from the Chosun era to the present day, in addition to conducting surveys and excavations.

Officials originally envision the project to be complete by 2013, but was delayed to 2022, due to budget issues.

Currently, an art piece titled "Invisible Gate" stands over the Donuimun site.

Images

References 

Gates in Korea
Gates in South Korea
Buildings and structures in Seoul
History of Seoul